The 1995 Calder Cup Playoffs of the American Hockey League began on April 12, 1995. The twelve teams that qualified, four from each division, played best-of-7 series for division semifinals and division finals. The highest remaining seed received a bye for the third round while the other two remaining teams played a best-of-3 series, with the winner advancing to play the bye-team in a best-of-7 series for the Calder Cup. The Calder Cup Final ended on May 26, 1995, with the Albany River Rats defeating the Fredericton Canadiens four games to zero to win the first Calder Cup in team history. Albany's Corey Schwab and Mike Dunham were co-winners of the Jack A. Butterfield Trophy as AHL playoff co-MVPs. Coincidentally, the River Rats parent club, the New Jersey Devils won the Stanley Cup in a four-game sweep over the Detroit Red Wings, making them the second pair of teams in history to win both the AHL's Calder Cup and NHL's Stanley Cup in the same season.

The Southern Division semifinal between Cornwall and Hershey was a penalty filled series. The two teams combined for 575 penalty minutes in the series, an AHL record. Hershey's 323 penalty minutes in that series set another AHL playoff record for most penalty minutes by one team in one series. Furthermore, Hershey set yet another AHL playoff record by accumulating 186 penalty minutes in game 5 of the series, the most by one team in one playoff game.

Playoff seeds
After the 1994-95 AHL regular season, 12 teams qualified for the playoffs. The top four teams from each division qualified for the playoffs. The Albany River Rats finished the regular season with the best overall record.

Atlantic Division
Prince Edward Island Senators - 90 points
St. John's Maple Leafs - 76 points
Fredericton Canadiens - 75 points
Saint John Flames - 67 points

Northern Division
Albany River Rats - 109 points
Portland Pirates - 104 points
Providence Bruins - 89 points
Adirondack Red Wings - 74 points

Southern Division
Binghamton Rangers - 93 points
Cornwall Aces - 85 points
Hershey Bears - 78 points
Rochester Americans - 77 points

Bracket

In each round the team that earned more points during the regular season receives home ice advantage, meaning they receive the "extra" game on home-ice if the series reaches the maximum number of games. For the Calder Cup Semifinal round, the team that earned the most points during the regular season out of the three remaining teams receives a bye directly to the Calder Cup Final. There is no set series format due to arena scheduling conflicts and travel considerations.

Division Semifinals 
Note 1: Home team is listed first.
Note 2: The number of overtime periods played (where applicable) is not specified

Atlantic Division

(A1) Prince Edward Island Senators vs. (A4) Saint John Flames

(A2) St. John's Maple Leafs vs. (A3) Fredericton Canadiens

Northern Division

(N1) Albany River Rats vs. (N4) Adirondack Red Wings

(N2) Portland Pirates vs. (N3) Providence Bruins

Southern Division

(S1) Binghamton Rangers vs. (S4) Rochester Americans

(S2) Cornwall Aces vs. (S3) Hershey Bears

Division Finals

Atlantic Division

(A1) Prince Edward Island Senators vs. (A3) Fredericton Canadiens

Northern Division

(N1) Albany River Rats vs. (N3) Providence Bruins

Southern Division

(S1) Binghamton Rangers vs. (S2) Cornwall Aces

Semifinal

Bye
(N1) Albany River Rats receive a bye to the Calder Cup Final by virtue of having earned the highest point total in the regular season out of the three remaining teams.

(S2) Cornwall Aces vs. (A3) Fredericton Canadiens

Calder Cup Final

(N1) Albany River Rats vs. (A3) Fredericton Canadiens

See also
1994–95 AHL season
List of AHL seasons

References

Calder
Calder Cup playoffs